is a Japanese manga artist and author of long-running shōjo manga Glass Mask.

Life 
She was born in Nishinomiya, Japan and grew up in Osaka. She lived nearby a rental bookstore (kashi-hon) in her childhood and started drawing manga herself, when she had too many unpaid bills at a rental bookstore and her mother forbid her to continue reading manga. Miuchi made her professional debut as a manga artist in 1967, aged only 16, with the manga Yama no Tsuki to Kodanuki in the shōjo magazine Margaret. Her early debut as a highschool-aged manga artist inspired Yukari Ichijo to start a professional career as a manga artist at the time. She became famous for publishing short stories in the early 1970s, among them also horror manga. Her 1975 short story Shiroi Kagebōshi is considered a classic of shōjo horror manga.

Her biggest success came in 1976, when she began the long-running and ongoing series Glass Mask (Glass no Kamen) about a girl becoming a famous theater actress. The manga has been adapated into a stage play, a live-action TV series and an anime series.

She won the Kodansha Manga Award (1982) for Youkihi-den and the Japan Cartoonists Association Award (1995) for Glass Mask.

Works

Series

 Moeru Niji (燃える虹), 1970
 13-gatsu no Higeki (13月の悲劇), 1971
 Amaranth no Joō (アマランスの女王), 1972
 Harukanaru Kaze to Hikari (はるかなる風と光), 1973–1974
 Kujaku-iro no Kanaria (孔雀色のカナリア), 1973–1974
 Shira-yuri no Kishi (白ゆりの騎士), 1974–1975
 Glass Mask (ガラスの仮面, Garasu no Kamen), since 1976, serialized in Hana to Yume and Bessatsu Hana to Yume
 Saint Alice Teikoku (聖アリス帝国, Sei-Arisu Teikoku), 1976–1978
Bara Monogatari (バラ物語), 1979
 Yōkihi-den (妖鬼妃伝), 1981
 Dynamite Milk Pie (ダイナマイト・みるく・パイ, Dainamaito Miruku Pai), 1982
 Amaterasu (アマテラス), 1986–1995

One-shots
Yama no Tsuki to Kodanuki to (山の月とこだぬきと), 1967
Shiroi Kagebōshi (白い影法師), 1975, published in Mimi
Dynamite Milkpie
Futari no Melody
Kaerazaru Hyuuga
Majou Medea
Niji no Ikusa
Oujo Alexandra
Pollyana's Knight
Shiroi Kageboshi

References

External links
Miuchi's homepage 

 

Women manga artists
Japanese female comics artists
Female comics writers
Japanese women writers
Winner of Kodansha Manga Award (Shōjo)
People from Osaka
1951 births
Living people
Manga artists from Osaka Prefecture